In geometry, the Fermat cubic, named after Pierre de Fermat, is a surface defined by

Methods of algebraic geometry provide the following parameterization of Fermat's cubic:

In projective space the Fermat cubic is given by

The 27 lines lying on the Fermat cubic are easy to describe explicitly: they are the 9 lines of the form (w : aw : y : by) where a and b are fixed numbers with cube −1, and their 18 conjugates under permutations of coordinates.

Real points of Fermat cubic surface.

References

Algebraic surfaces